Barnesville may refer to:

In Canada:
Barnesville, New Brunswick

In the USA:
 Barnesville, Alabama
 Barnesville, Georgia
 Barnesville, Kansas
 Barnesville's Post
 Barnesville, Maryland
Barnesville (MARC station)
 Barnesville, Minnesota
 Barnesville, Clinton County, Missouri
 Barnesville, Macon County, Missouri
 Barnesville, North Carolina
 Barnesville, Ohio
 Barnesville Baltimore and Ohio Railroad Depot
 Barnesville, Pennsylvania
 Barnesville Township, Clay County, Minnesota